The full name of IETF is "The Internet Engineering Task Force"which  is the premier Internet standards body. It develops open standards through collaboration for open processes.

The IETF Administrative Support Activity (IASA) is an activity housed within the Internet Society (ISOC).

See also
Computer-supported collaboration

References

External links
The Internet Society
The Internet Engineering Task Force

Internet Standards